The 1991 UNLV Rebels football team was an American football team that represented the University of Nevada, Las Vegas in the Big West Conference during the 1991 NCAA Division I-A football season. In their second year under head coach Jim Strong, the team compiled a 4–7 record.

Schedule

References

UNLV
UNLV Rebels football seasons
UNLV Rebels football